Marco Förster (born 23 April 1976) is a German former professional footballer who played as a defender.

Career
His main abilities are his good balance and defensive positioning, along with his consistency during the game. Förster was a personal selection of Giorgos Donis when he was head coach at Ilisiakos and he followed Donis when he became the coach of AEL in 2004. From then on, he was an important unit for Larissa as a starting player or a substitute, and club's vice-captain, behind Nikos Dabizas. He earned 87 caps and scored five goals for the Maroons. He faced German club 1. FC Nürnberg in the 2007–08 UEFA Cup. His career highlight was when he won the Greek Cup with AEL in 2007 against Panathinaikos. He left Larissa on 1 July 2008 and joined Anagennisi Karditsa, where he scored two goals and was included in the best defenders of Beta Ethniki.

Honours

AEL
Greek Cup: 2006–07

References

External links
 

1976 births
Living people
Footballers from Dresden
German footballers
Association football defenders
1. FC Lokomotive Leipzig players
Super League Greece players
2. Bundesliga players
FSV Zwickau players
Rot-Weiss Essen players
Athinaikos F.C. players
Athlitiki Enosi Larissa F.C. players
Ethnikos Piraeus F.C. players
AEP Paphos FC players
Anagennisi Karditsa F.C. players
FC Oberlausitz Neugersdorf players
German expatriate footballers
German expatriate sportspeople in Cyprus
Expatriate footballers in Cyprus
German expatriate sportspeople in Greece
Expatriate footballers in Greece